Friendship is an unincorporated community located within Upper Pittsgrove Township in Salem County, New Jersey, United States.

The community is the site of Friendship United Methodist Church.

References

Pilesgrove Township, New Jersey
Unincorporated communities in Salem County, New Jersey
Unincorporated communities in New Jersey